Tiago Josué Pereira (born November 29, 1976, in Sapucaia do Sul, Brazil) is a jockey in the sport of Thoroughbred horse racing. He entered professional racing as an apprentice in 1994, winning 96 races at Brazil's Cristal Racecourse in his first year. Since then he has competed at various racetracks around the world, including Dubai, France, and Singapore, and the United States, and has won more than 1,750 races.

On March 27, 2010, Pereira won the richest and most important race of his career aboard Glória de Campeão when he captured the US$10 million Dubai World Cup at Meydan Racecourse.

References

1976 births
Living people
Brazilian jockeys